Saint-Hellier is a commune in the Seine-Maritime department in the Normandy region in northern France.

Geography

Population

Places of interest
 The church of St. Hellier, dating from the eleventh century.
 The chapel of Saint-Sauveur at La Frenaye built in 1788.
 The seventeenth century chapel of Saint-Paër at Orival-sous-Bellencombre.

See also
Communes of the Seine-Maritime department

References

Communes of Seine-Maritime